Louis Moilliet (October 6, 1880 – August 24, 1962) was an artist from Switzerland who was noted as a painter and stained glass designer.  He was lifelong friends with fellow artists Paul Klee and August Macke, spending time painting and traveling with them in Tunisia 1914 and introducing Klee into the group Der Blaue Reiter (The Blue Rider) earlier in 1911.  His expressionist painting style was closely connected with that of the Orphism movement.  One of his more popular works is titled "In The Circus".

References 
 Chilvers, Ian (2004), text from The Oxford Dictionary of Art on encyclopedia.com website "Moilliet, Louis", Retrieved 11 February 2011.

External links
 Louis Moilliet - official website

1880 births
1962 deaths
Swiss stained glass artists and manufacturers